The Ennis Tigers were a minor league baseball franchise based in Ennis, Texas. From 1914 to 1917, the Tigers played exclusively as members of the Class D level Central Texas League. Ennis played for the duration of the Central Texas League, winning the 1915 league championship.

History
The Ennis Tigers first began minor league play in 1914. The Tigers became charter members of the Central Texas League, which formed as a Class D level six–team minor league. The Ennis Tigers would play in all four seasons of the Central Season League and Ed Wicker would manage all four Ennis teams. The charter members of the Central Texas League were the Corsicana Athletics, Hillsboro, Texas, Italy, Texas, Waxahachie Buffaloes and West, Texas joined Ennis in league play.

In their first season of league play, the Ennis Tigers and the Central Texas League members began play on May 10, 1914, but the league did not complete the season. The Central Texas League was scheduled to play a split–season schedule, but the second half was shortened when the league folded on July 25, 1914. Overall, Ennis had a 31–28 record, which placed third in the overall standings, 4.5 games behind the 1st place Waxahachie Buffaloes. After the league stopped play, the Central Texas League did have a playoff as the Waxahachie Buffaloes defeated West 3 games to 2.

After folding the previous season, the 1915, the Central Texas League reformed and the Ennis Tigers won the championship in a shortened season.> Joining the Ennis Tigers in the 1915 Central Texas League were the Corsicana A's, Kaufman Kings, Mexia Gassers, Terrell Cubs and Waxahachie Athletics. Beginning play on May 17, 1915, the Central Texas League folded before the season ended. On July 24, 1915, the Central Texas League folded. The Ennis Tigers had the best overall record in the 1915 Central Texas League. The Ennis Tigers won the first–half of the Central Texas League planned split–season schedule. The Mexia Gassers won the shortened second half of the schedule. No playoffs were held and Ennis had the best overall record at 35–26, finishing 3.0 games ahead of the 2nd place Corsicana A's in the overall standings.

The Ennis Tigers continued play as the 1916 Central Texas League again reformed. The Tigers finished in second place overall after rejoining the league. The Central Texas League began their third season of play on April 28, 1916. The league members joining Ennis in 1916 were  Marlin Marlins, Mexia Gassers, Temple Governors, Terrell Terrors and Waxahachie Athletics. Ennis and the Central Texas League disbanded on July 16, 1916 without playoffs. At 36–25, the Temple Governors had the league's best record when it folded, 1.0 game ahead of the Ennis Tigers, who finished with a 35–26 record.

The 1917 Ennis Tigers and the Central Texas League played their final seasons, with the league folding before completing the schedule. The 1917 Central Texas League played as a four–team league before permanently folding before on June 6, 1917. The Central Texas League began play on May 21, 1917 with Marlin Marlins, Mexia Gassers and Temple Governors joining Ennis in the league play. On June 6, 1917, the Central Texas League permanently folded. At the time the league folded, the Mexia Gassers had the best overall record at 8–6, just 0.5 games ahead of the Ennis Tigers who were 8–7. No playoffs were held.

After the Central Texas League permanently folded, Ennis, Texas has not hosted another minor league franchise.

The ballpark
The name of the ballpark hosting the Ennis Tigers for minor league play is unknown.

Timeline

Year–by–year records

Notable alumni
Roy Leslie (1914, 1916)
Jim Walkup (1916)

See also
Ennis Tigers players

References

External links
 Baseball Reference
Team photo

Defunct minor league baseball teams
Professional baseball teams in Texas
Defunct baseball teams in Texas
Baseball teams established in 1914
Baseball teams disestablished in 1917
1914 establishments in Texas
Ellis County, Texas
Central Texas League teams
1917 disestablishments in Texas